Rugby sevens at the 2014 Commonwealth Games was the fifth time in the competition's history that the event took place. The tournament's preliminaries took place on 26 July, with the classification matches, quarterfinals, semifinals and medal matches the following day. The venue for the competition was Ibrox Stadium. South Africa beat the reigning champions New Zealand in the final on 27 July, beating their opponents 17-12. It was the first time that New Zealand had been beaten in any game since the inception of rugby sevens at the Commonwealth Games in 1998, ending their 30 match win streak and marking the first time any other nation had won the competition.

171,000 people attended the two-day competition, a record for the sport.

Participating nations

The full pools and fixtures for the event were announced on 18 February 2014.

Nigeria were originally announced as one of the sixteen teams, but shortly after the team was withdrawn from the rugby competition and replaced by Barbados.

Pools and format

The sixteen teams were divided into four pools of four nations, with each nation playing their other pool opponents once, every nation playing three times during the group stages. Nations were awarded 3 points for a win, 2 for a draw and one point for a loss, the top two nations of every pool advance to the quarterfinals of the medal competition. The winners of each pool then faced the runners up of a different pool in the quarterfinals in a straight single-elimination knockout competition. The winners moved on to the semifinals, with the winners then moving onto the final, and the losers of the semifinals contesting a play off for the bronze medal.

Points System

The points system was the same one used in most sevens competitions, including the IRB Sevens World Series:
 3 points for a win
 2 points for a draw
 1 point for losing

Pool stage
The round robin stage was played on 26 July 2014. All teams played three matches, with the top two in each pool qualifying for the medal competition, and the bottom two qualifying to the bowl competition.

Pool A

Pool B

Pool C

Pool D

Knockout stage

Medal competition

Quarter-finals

Semi-finals

Bronze medal match

Gold medal match

Plate competition

Semi-finals

Plate final

Bowl competition

Quarter-finals

Semi-finals

Bowl final

Shield competition

Semi-finals

Shield final

Medalists

References

External links

 Commonwealth Games Rugby 7s Medal Winners
 Official results book – Rugby Sevens

Rugby sevens
2014
Rugby union in Glasgow
Rugby sevens competitions in Scotland
2014 rugby sevens competitions
Commonwealth Games